"Marlene on the Wall" is a song by American singer-songwriter Suzanne Vega. In addition to being her debut single, it appears on her self-titled debut album, released in 1985.

While the song failed to make any impact on the charts with its initial release, it became Vega's first top 40 hit in the UK upon a re-release in 1986. It has gone on to become one of Vega's best-known songs and has been included on the greatest hits albums Tried & True and Retrospective.

Background

The title of the song refers to actress Marlene Dietrich.

Reception

Upon its original release, "Marlene on the Wall" failed to gain much success, stalling at number 86 on the UK charts. However, after being re-released in 1986, it became her first top 40 hit, peaking at number 21. The song found its greatest success in Ireland, where it peaked at number 9, becoming her first top 10 hit in any country.

Personnel

Suzanne Vega – acoustic guitar, vocals
Sue Evans – drums
Jon Gordon – electric guitar
Frank Gavis – bass guitar
C.P. Roth – synthesizer

References

1985 songs
Suzanne Vega songs
1985 singles
1986 singles